Mike or Michael Archer may refer to:
Mike Archer (American football) (born 1953), American football coach
Mike Archer (paleontologist) (born 1945), former director of the Australian Museum
Michael Eugene Archer, stage name D'Angelo (born 1974), American singer-songwriter and record producer